Mullumbimby (2013) is a novel by Australian author Melissa Lucashenko. It concerns Jo Breen, a Bundjalung woman, who buys some of her country and the conflicts that arises. Mullumbimby won the Fiction category of the Queensland Literary Awards in 2013.

Plot summary

Following her divorce, Jo Breen mows the lawns at a cemetery for white settlers in the small town of Mullumbimby, inland from the north coast of New South Wales. She works to buy herself a block of land and to care for herself and her teenage daughter.  Breen is a Goorie, an Indigenous woman from the local area, and her relationship to the land she owns is deep-felt and defining. 

Jo becomes embroiled in a local Native Title dispute between two rival Aboriginal families, which leads her to profound discoveries about culture, and her and her daughter’s place in it.

Notes
 Dedication: for my teachers
 Epigraph: "Thin love ain't love at all" - Toni Morrison, Beloved
 Author's note: This novel is set mainly on the Arakwal lands of the Bundjalung Nation. Like the characters, however, the specific locations of Tin Wagon Road, Piccabeen and Lake Majestic are entirely fictional. They exist only in the author's imagination.

Reviews

 James Tierney in The Newton Review of Books noted: "Lucashenko bursts the myth that Indigenous culture must present a unified face to Australia in order to be strong. The balance of voices here is a careful one, born of deep respect and a clear eye."  
 Eve Vincent in The Sydney Review of Books found "The novel plumbs the depths of bitterness, conflict and destruction the native title claims process too often leaves in its wake. It brilliantly captures, in a robust vernacular style, the fury and cynicism spawned by the long-lasting and emotionally exhausting claims process."
 Also reviewed by Radio National, The Sydney Morning Herald, Australian Book Review, Southerly, and The Age.

Awards and nominations
 2013 shortlisted Queensland Literary Awards — The Courier-Mail People's Choice Queensland Book of the Year
 2013 winner Queensland Literary Awards — Fiction Book Award — Deloitte Fiction Book Award
 2014 longlisted the Stella Prize
 2014 longlisted Miles Franklin Literary Award
 2014 shortlisted Nita Kibble Literary Award
 2014 winner Victorian Premier's Literary Awards — Prize for Indigenous Writing
2015 longlisted International Dublin Literary Award

References

Further reading
 Brookman, Victoria "Mothering, resistance and survival in Kathleen Mary Fallon’s Paydirt and Melissa Lucashenko’s Mullumbimby" in Journal of the Motherhood Initiative for Research and Community Involvement, Vol 10, Iss 1, 2019, pp148–159

External links
 Library holdings of Mullumbimby
 "Tree change: Melissa Lucashenko on ‘Mullumbimby’", Books+Publishing interview with Lucashenko about the book
 Griffith Review interview with Lucashenko about Mullumbimby

2013 Australian novels
Novels by Melissa Lucashenko
Novels set in New South Wales
University of Queensland Press books